Guyton is a city in Effingham County, Georgia, United States. The population was 2,289 at the 2020 census, up from 1,684 in 2010.

History
While some of the early settlers came from the Savannah area, it seems that most came from North and South Carolina. The community became known as "Whitesville". The Squire was not married and left no heir when he died in 1838. White had granted a right-of-way to the new Central of Georgia Railway Co. prior to his death. He was buried on his own land, as was the custom then. His grave is in the rear of the present New Providence Church. Years later, a local controversy was started when some of this community tried to have Squire White's grave moved to the new local cemetery. It was never moved.

Shortly after White's death, the Effingham County Commissioners took over his land for unpaid taxes. They had a survey made, laid off lots and streets just as they still are today, and sold it all at public auction as payment of his taxes. Many lots were bought by affluent Savannah residents as a place for a summer home. At this time, the fever was very bad in Savannah.

When the Central of Georgia Railroad Company, having a charter to build and operate a railroad from Savannah to Macon and on to Marthasville (now Atlanta), laid their track through Whitesville in 1837 or 1838, they referred to this place as Station Number 30. After a short time, locals asked the railroad company to give this place a name so they could request the federal government to place a post office here. Since there was another town in the state named Whitesville, Mr. W. W. Gordon, President of the Central Railroad, named this location "Guyton", after Archibald Guyton, a prominent local citizen. The U. S. Post Office established a post office at Guyton, Georgia, December 31, 1851.

Guyton was an affluent town by the time of the Civil War. During the Civil War, the Confederacy built a hospital in Guyton. There are 26 Confederate soldiers buried in the local cemetery. When General Sherman marched from Atlanta to Savannah on his burn and destroy mission, he came through Guyton with his main body of troops. It took five days for his army to pass through, with some of his troops looting, burning, and stealing. The depot and tracks were destroyed, which could explain why some records of this period are not complete.

In 1887, Guyton was incorporated and issued a town charter by the State of Georgia. The local member of the Georgia Legislature who had the bill introduced and passed was Colonel Clarance Guyton, a grandson of Archibald Guyton.

The Guyton City Hall has had many requests for information about the family of Guytons. However, little is known about their background. They were rumored to have come from England to North Carolina. Archibald Guyton came to this area from North Carolina in 1825. He was married twice. His first wife was the widow Tondee of Savannah. There is a Tondee farm or plantation listed in Effingham County near Guyton during this period, so she may have had connections there. The Georgia census of 1850 shows Archibald came to Georgia in 1825. He was in the timber business. His first wife, widow Tondee died (fever) and is buried in the old Providence Baptist Cemetery. His second wife was Harriet Patterson, of this area. Archibald had a son, Robert, by his first wife and a son, Charles, by his second wife. There were several girls also as are listed in his cemetery plot. Archibald's grandson, Clarance, was an attorney and maintained a law office in Savannah. Everyone called him Colonel Guyton. He was a member of the Georgia Legislature and was very prominent.

There are no families named Guyton living in the community today. The last Guyton family home, which was occupied by Clarance, his sister Belle Hendry, and also his sister Tallullah and her husband Fred Seckinger is still in excellent condition. It is located on Highway 17, just north of the Guyton city limits.

Every December, the spirit of Christmas is highlighted in Guyton with an annual tour of homes. This community-sponsored event will usually host around three to four thousand visitors every year. Visitors will usually tour about a dozen homes, and nearly all of the churches are open for the tour. Many homes in the historic district will have lighted doors. The festivities usually begin with a country supper and tour of the historical city. The Guyton Volunteer Fire Department usually illuminates the nearly 7,000 lights each year on the Saturday following Thanksgiving.

Today, Guyton is still a small town, but one with much history. As visitors drive through its narrow lanes and streets, particularly in December of each year, they see a Georgia town pretty much the way it was nearly a century ago.

Geography

Guyton is located in west-central Effingham County at  (32.336338, -81.393763). State Routes 17 and 119 cross in the southwest part of town. GA 17 leads northwest  to Oliver and south  to Bloomingdale, west of Savannah, while GA 119 leads northeast  to Springfield, the Effingham County seat, and southwest  to Interstate 16 in Bulloch County.

Demographics

2020 census

As of the 2020 United States census, there were 2,289 people, 665 households, and 527 families residing in the city.

2010 census
As of the 2010 United States Census, there were 1,684 people living in the city. The racial makeup of the city was 60.3% White, 35.7% Black, 0.1% Native American, 0.4% Asian and 1.4% from two or more races. 2.2% were Hispanic or Latino of any race.

2000 census
As of the census of 2000, there were 917 people, 300 households, and 236 families living in the city. The racial makeup of the city was 60.31% White, 37.08% African American, 0.55% Native American, 0.44% Asian, 0.22% from other races, and 1.42% from two or more races. Hispanic or Latino of any race were 1.31% of the population.

There were 300 households, out of which 42.7% had children under the age of 18 living with them, 57.3% were married couples living together, 16.3% had a female householder with no husband present, and 21.3% were non-families. 18.3% of all households were made up of individuals, and 8.7% had someone living alone who was 65 years of age or older. The average household size was 3.06 and the average family size was 3.50.

In the city, the population was spread out, with 33.9% under the age of 18, 8.6% from 18 to 24, 26.5% from 25 to 44, 19.2% from 45 to 64, and 11.8% who were 65 years of age or older. The median age was 30 years. For every 100 females, there were 96.4 males. For every 100 females age 18 and over, there were 86.5 males.

The median income for a household in the city was $27,679, and the median income for a family was $34,250. Males had a median income of $31,719 versus $18,906 for females. The per capita income for the city was $12,409. About 13.8% of families and 18.7% of the population were below the poverty line, including 33.5% of those under age 18 and 8.1% of those age 65 or over.

References

External links
City of Guyton official website
Guyton Confederate General Hospital historical marker

Cities in Georgia (U.S. state)
Cities in Effingham County, Georgia
Savannah metropolitan area